The Ice Age Floods National Geologic Trail is a network of routes connecting natural sites and facilities that provide interpretation of the geological consequences of the Glacial Lake Missoula floods of the last glacial period that occurred about 18,000 to 15,000 years ago. It includes sites in Washington, Oregon, Idaho, and Montana. It was designated as the first National Geologic Trail in the United States in 2009.

History
The National Park Service (NPS) commissioned an environmental assessment, which concluded that creation of a "National Geologic Trail—designating the Floods pathways managed by the National Park Service, with an Interagency Technical Committee representing the federal, tribal, and state agencies and a Trail Advisory Committee to assist the Trail Manager and staff" was the preferred option. Subsequently, the Omnibus Public Land Management Act of 2009 authorized establishing the Ice Age Floods National Geologic Trail in parts of Montana, Idaho, Washington, and Oregon and established NPS administration of the Trail.

Geologic basis for the trail

At the end of the last Ice Age (the Wisconsonian Ice Age), a branch of the Cordilleran Ice Sheet moved out of Canada into the Idaho panhandle region. The periodic rupturing of the ice dam resulted in the Missoula Floods – cataclysmic floods that swept across Idaho and Eastern Washington, and then down the Columbia River Gorge approximately 40 times during a 2,000 year period. The flood front swept in a wave across Idaho and Washington at speeds approaching , and Glacial Lake Missoula drained in periods as short as 2 days.

The Columbia River channel downstream was blocked by the Okanogan lobe of the Cordilleran, impounding water in Glacial Lake Columbia.  As a result, the floods could not continue down the Columbia River, being forced instead to flood over the highlands of Eastern Washington,  vastly transforming the landscape by forming the Grand Coulee, Moses Coulee,  the Channeled Scablands, Dry Falls, Palouse Falls and many similar features. The cumulative effect of the floods was to excavate  of loess, sediment and basalt from the channeled scablands of eastern Washington and to transport it downstream. Over a period of 2,000 to 2,500 years, the repetition of ice dam failure and flood was repeated 40-60 times, leaving a lasting mark on the landscape.

There are a number of characteristic features that illustrate the effect of these ice dams and power of the resulting floods:
 Large portions of the scabland region of Eastern Washington were stripped bare of topsoil and left as the base basalt rock. 
	The landscape is extensively eroded, with deep sheer-walled canyons in the Grand Coulee, Moses Coulee, the Wallula Gap, and the Columbia River Gorge.  
	There are  erratic boulders which originated in Canada and Montana, found well up valleys such as the Willamette River valley far south of any evidence of glacial activity; these boulders were ice rafted in and deposited as the ice was stranded & melted in backwaters of temporary lakes.  
	The scablands formed include deep kolks formed by local turbulence, which plucked basalt boulders out and excavated pits in the middle of relatively smooth plains. 
	Backwaters of temporary lakes formed during the floods show extensive & periodic deposits of silt and sand.

Trail features

The trail comprises routes throughout the Pacific Northwest where the Ice Age Floods left a lasting impact. Regions and featured sites include 
 The Glacial Lake Missoula region in Montana in which the waters were initially impounded  
 The Lake Coeur d'Alene area and Clark Fork river of Idaho through which the flood waters periodically flowed
Farragut State Park
Lake Pend Oreille
 The Waterville Plateau in Washington state where the Okanagon lobe impounded Glacial Lake Columbia and diverted the flow through Moses Coulee, Grand Coulee and Dry Falls
The Withrow Moraine and Jameson Lake Drumlin Field 
Boulder Park 
Sims Corner Eskers and Kames 
 Erosion features from the floods such as the Channeled Scablands, Drumheller Channels, Crab Creek, Corfu Slide and Palouse Falls in Washington
Sun Lakes-Dry Falls State Park
Ginkgo Petrified Forest State Park 
Lyons Ferry State Park 
Steamboat Rock State Park 
 Temporary lakes such as Lake Lewis in Washington as well as Lake Condon and Lake Allison in Oregon and the evidence for these temporary lakes as seen in the ice rafted erratics and in the deposits of the Touchet Formation
Yakima Sportsman State Park
Bellevue Erratic
 Erosion features such as the Wallula Gap through the Horse Heaven Hills in southern Washington, the Columbia River Gorge on the border between Oregon and Washington and Alameda Ridge in Portland.
Columbia Hills State Park
Beacon Rock State Park
Multnomah Falls
Portland Women's Forum
Vista House
Several museums in the region feature local aspects of the natural history of the floods.

See also 

 Ice Age National Scientific Reserve
 Ice Age National Scenic Trail

References

External links
 Ice Age Floods Institute
Official National Park Service site
Ice Age Floods National Geologic Trail Long-range Interpretive Plan
 Resource Study of Alternatives

National Trails of the United States
Protected areas established in 2009
Historical geology
Ice ages
Protected areas of the United States